Synagrops bellus, the blackmouth bass, is a species of fish in the family Acropomatidae.

Distribution 
They can be found all around the coastal waters of the western Atlantic Ocean from Newfoundland to Argentina.

Description 
They have 10 dorsal spines, 9 dorsal soft rays, 2 anal spines, and 7 anal soft rays.

References

bellus
Fish described in 1896